Hir, hir, hir ("Whim, whim, whim") is the sixth album by Croatian pop singer Josipa Lisac, released by Jugoton in 1980.

The song "Magla" became one of Josipa's biggest pop hits. It is to date very popular in former Yugoslavia.

Track listing 

Composed and written by Karlo Metikoš and Ivica Krajač.

 Pazi, oštar pas (Take care, vicious dog)
 Rendez-vous sa Sotonom (Date with Satan)
 Magla (Fog)
 Ne budi lud (Don't be crazy)
 Mister Gaf (Mr. Embarrassment)
 Make up
 Knock down
 Hir, hir, hir (Whim, whim, whim)
 U mislima (In my mind)

External links 
  https://web.archive.org/web/20090310041037/http://www.josipalisac.com/hr/albumi-hir.html

1980 albums
Josipa Lisac albums